The town of Morpeth in Northumberland, England, has what is reputed to be the tightest curve ( radius) of any main railway line in Britain. The track turns approximately 98° from a northwesterly to an easterly direction immediately west of Morpeth Station on an otherwise fast section of the East Coast Main Line railway. This was a major factor in three serious derailments between 1969 and 1994.

1877 derailment

On 25 March 1877, the 10:30 p.m. train from Edinburgh to London Kings Cross was derailed on the curve.  It was travelling at only . The officer from the Railway Inspectorate who held the inquiry, Captain Henry Tyler, found that faulty track was to blame. He also commented perspicaciously "It would obviously be better if a deviation line could be constructed, to avoid the use of so sharp a curve on a main line". This "deviation line" has still not yet been built .

1969 derailment

On 7 May 1969 a northbound Aberdonian sleeping car express train from London to Aberdeen derailed on the curve. The train in question consisted of Deltic locomotive The Royal Northumberland Fusiliers hauling 11 carriages. Six people were killed, 21 were injured and the roof of the station's northbound platform was damaged. The driver had apparently allowed his attention to wander because he was thinking about an official letter that he had been handed when booking on duty, asking for an explanation of time lost on a previous journey. The investigation into this accident led to the implementation of alerts for major speed restrictions via the Automatic Warning System. However, despite the recommendation for this system stemming from the accident at Morpeth and the common reference to the 'Morpeth warnings', the gradually stepped speed restriction for the Morpeth curve did not meet the guidelines for this system and it was not installed until at least after the 1984 derailment.

1984 derailment

The southbound sleeper service from Aberdeen to London was derailed at the same location on 24 June 1984. There were no fatalities but 29 passengers and 6 train crew were injured. Two houses narrowly escaped being demolished by the derailed carriages.

The train involved was led by Class 47 locomotive number 47452, hauling seven British Rail Mark 3 sleeping cars between two British Railways Mark 1 brake vans.

The driver involved in this accident, Peter Allan, was prosecuted for being under the influence of alcohol, but acquitted after what was described by the Expert Witness Institute as an ambush defence. Mr Allan had consumed alcohol both before and after booking on duty, but the defence countered that he suffered from bronchitis and had in the past experienced severe coughing fits that had caused him to fall unconscious.

1992 accident

A further accident, unrelated to the Morpeth curve, occurred on 13 November 1992, when a collision between two freight trains at Morpeth led to one fatality. A Class 56 locomotive ran into the back of a pipe train. The cab of the locomotive was crushed and the driver was killed. The accident occurred during engineering work and was the result of the locomotive driver and the signaller at Morpeth failing to come to a clear understanding concerning required movements.

1994 derailment

On 27 June 1994 an express parcels train crashed at the curve. The locomotive and the majority of carriages overturned, without fatalities, but causing injury to the driver. The Health and Safety Executive estimate that trains will overturn at above , and noted that "Morpeth 1994 was a very serious event, which could easily have been fatal".

See also
List of British rail accidents
List of rail accidents (worldwide)

References

Further reading

External links 
Official report into the 1969 accident at The Railways Archive    
Official report into the 1984 accident at The Railways Archive

Railway accidents and incidents in Northumberland
Railway accidents in 1969
Railway accidents in 1984
Railway accidents in 1992
Railway accidents in 1994
20th century in Northumberland
Morpeth, Northumberland
Accidents and incidents involving British Rail
Lists of railway accidents and incidents in England
Derailments in England
1984 disasters in the United Kingdom
1992 disasters in the United Kingdom
1969 disasters in the United Kingdom
1877 disasters in the United Kingdom
1994 disasters in the United Kingdom
Railway accidents in 1877